Hamish Kingston (born 17 December 1990) is an Australian cricketer. He plays for Tasmania. On 31 December 2015 he made his Twenty20 debut for the Adelaide Strikers in the 2015–16 Big Bash League.

References

1990 births
Living people
Australian cricketers
Adelaide Strikers cricketers
Hobart Hurricanes cricketers
Tasmania cricketers
Place of birth missing (living people)